Sánchez Barcáiztegui was a  of the Spanish Republican Navy. She took part in the Spanish Civil War on the side of the government of the Second Spanish Republic.

She was named in honor of Victoriano Sánchez Barcáiztegui, a Spanish Navy Teniente de Navío (lieutenant) who took part in the Battle of Callao and was killed in action in the Battle of Motrico during the Third Carlist War.

Service history

Pre-Spanish Civil War
Barcáiztegui was launched in Cartagena, Spain in 1926 and commissioned in 1928. She was anchored in Barcelona harbor in 1934, during which time she served as the prison for Manuel Azaña after the Asturian uprising.

Spanish Civil War
Following the coup of July 1936, the captain took the side of the Nationalists and rebelled, but the crew remained loyal to the Second Spanish Republic and they took over the ship.

This fleet entered the Cantabrian Sea where Spanish Republican Army troops were isolated from the remaining Republican-controlled territories. All ships, except Ciscar, which had been requisitioned by the Basque Auxiliary Navy, José Luis Díez, two C and two B-class submarines, returned to the Mediterranean Sea.

Sánchez Barcáiztegui took part in the Battle of Cape Palos where she, together with Almirante Antequera and Lepanto, engaged the cruiser , firing four torpedoes. Sánchez Barcáiztegui was awarded the Distintivo de Madrid along with other vessels.

On 5 March 1939, Sánchez Barcáíztegui was seriously damaged by a bomb after being attacked by five Nationalist Savoia-Marchetti SM.79s medium bombers; the attack also damaged destroyers  and Lazaga.

Post-warBarcáiztegui'' was refloated in 1940, repaired by the Nationalists, and recommissioned, serving until decommissioned in 1964. She was scrapped in 1965.

Notes

References

External links
Destroyers in Spanish civil war 
Battle of Cape Palos 

Churruca-class destroyers
Ships built in Cartagena, Spain
1926 ships
Spanish Republican Navy
Military units and formations of the Spanish Civil War